Raising The Dead is the 267th episode of NCIS: Los Angeles, and the fifth episode of season 12. It aired on December 6, 2020, with "Cash Flow". In the episode, Kensi must come face-to-face with a sociopath who has been obsessed with her since she put him in jail years ago, in order to get intel on a matter of national security.

Plot 
The episode starts with two fugitive men named Randy Sinclair (Daryl Crittenden) and David Kessler (Frank Military) making an escape. While Sinclair continues his path, Kessler goes a different way, and is caught by a guard.

Meanwhile, Kensi Blye is tasked by Secret Service Agent Alicia Monroe (Angel Parker) to interview Kessler for the intel, since Kessler has had an obsession for Kensi ever since she put him in jail in 2008 (which also got her into the Office of Special Projects). The rest of the team, minus Deeks due to his NCIS-LAPD liaison having been suspended amidst major department realignments, is looped in on the case. Sam Hanna and Devin Rountree travel to Sinclair's last known whereabouts and discover the corpse of one of the guards that tried to apprehend Sinclair, leading them to determine that Sinclair has backup. Grisha "G." Callen interviews Kessler's ex-girlfriend Michelle Boucher (Izabella Miko).

Nell Jones informs Deeks that his liaison position to NCIS has been officially terminated by the LAPD. Fatima Namazi discovers Kessler's ex-lawyer has a connection to the White House. Kensi offers Kessler a phone call with Boucher, though Kessler casts doubt as she is afraid of him. He is proven correct after Boucher refuses to speak to him. Kessler proposes another solution: he gets a three-minute phone call with the President of the United States in exchange on Sinclair's whereabouts. After his call with the President, Kessler shows Kensi the location of Sinclair's hideout. Sam and Rountree arrive at Sinclair's hideout and capture him.

In the aftermath, Fatima alerts Kensi, Deeks and Callen that Kessler was released from prison eight hours ago under a Presidential Executive Order. Kensi and Deeks hurry to secure location and Callen races to Boucher's house, only to find her gone. He discovers a picture of Kessler and Boucher together, making the team realize that she was not one of Kessler's victims, but his partner, and that Kessler had planned everything the entire time; leverage Sinclair in order to get himself out of prison. Kensi is left a major target for Kessler.

Reception
The episode was watched by 3.86 million viewers, while scoring 2.30 million DVR viewers, for a total of 6.16 million.

References

External links
 
 

NCIS: Los Angeles episodes
2020 American television episodes